Keith O'Neill  (born 16 February 1976) is a former professional footballer who represented the Republic of Ireland. He played as a left-sided midfielder, but could sometimes play as a striker. Despite being an exceptionally talented youngster, his career was ultimately cut short by successive injuries caused by a degenerative bone disease.

Career
O'Neill began his playing career with Dublin side Tolka Rovers at the age of 6 before transferring to Home Farm.

As a promising youngster, O'Neill was spotted by several sides, including Norwich City, who went on to sign him when he was 18. O'Neill immediately impressed at the Norfolk club, despite being injury prone. The injury problems, some of them stemming him having suffered from spondylosis as a child, affected him virtually from the start of his career and ultimately curtailed his progress.

O'Neill went on to play for Middlesbrough and Coventry City. While at Coventry, he was diagnosed with two degenerative bone conditions in his spine, spondylolisthesis and spondylosis, which was essentially a double fracture of part of the cord that threatened to leave him disabled. These conditions eventually forced his retirement.

International career
O'Neill made 13 appearances for his country, scoring four goals, including scoring twice against Bolivia at Giants Stadium in 1996.

References

External links

Career Information at 'Flown from the Nest'

1976 births
Living people
Republic of Ireland association footballers
Home Farm F.C. players
Norwich City F.C. players
Middlesbrough F.C. players
Coventry City F.C. players
Premier League players
Republic of Ireland international footballers
Republic of Ireland under-21 international footballers
Tolka Rovers F.C. players
Association football midfielders